United Nations Security Council Resolution 94 adopted on 29 May 1951, noted with regret the death of International Court of Justice Judge José Philadelpho de Barros e Azevedo on 7 May 1951 and decided that the election to fill the vacancy should take place during the sixth session of the General Assembly.  The Council further decided that this election should take place prior to the regular election which was to be held at the same session to fill the five vacancies which were to occur owing to the expiration on 5 February 1952 of five of the members.

The resolution was adopted unanimously.

See also
 List of United Nations Security Council Resolutions 1 to 100 (1946–1953)

References
Text of the Resolution at undocs.org

External links
 

 0094
 0094
May 1951 events